Bogerud is a station on Østensjø Line (line 3) of the Oslo Metro. The station is located between Bøler and Skullerud,  from Stortinget. The station was opened 26 November 1967. Helge Abrahamsen was the station's architect.

The Bogerud neighborhood is a residential area, developed mostly during the 1960s. Bogerud station was the scene of a murder in 2002.

References

External links

Oslo Metro stations in Oslo
Railway stations opened in 1967
1967 establishments in Norway